Spriggs is a surname. Notable people with the surname include:

Archibald E. Spriggs (1866–1921), lieutenant governor of Montana
David Spriggs (footballer) (born 1981), Australian rules footballer
Edmund Ivens Spriggs (1871–1949), British physician and medical researcher
Elbert Eugene Spriggs (1937–2021), Founder, Twelve Tribes group
Elizabeth Spriggs (1929–2008), English actress
Francis Spriggs (died 1725), British pirate
George Spriggs (baseball) (born 1937), American baseball player
George Spriggs (politician) (1926–2015), Australian politician
James Spriggs Payne (1819–1882), President of Liberia
Jason Spriggs, American football player
John T. Spriggs (1825–1888), U.S. Representative from New York
Larry Spriggs (born 1959), American basketball player
Leslie Spriggs (1910–1990), British Labour politician
Marcus Spriggs (born 1974), American football player
Matthew Spriggs, Australian archaeologist
Robin Spriggs (born 1974), American writer
Steve Spriggs (born 1956), English footballer
William Spriggs, American public servant

See also
Sprigg (disambiguation)
Sprigge
Spriggs Payne Airport (IATA: MLW, ICAO: GLMR), 3 miles from Monrovia, the capital of the Republic of Liberia in West Africa